Tim Blanks (born ) is a Canadian-New Zealander fashion journalist, broadcaster and writer.

Career 
Blanks is the former host of the television show Fashion File, which he hosted from 1989 until 2006. He worked as editor-at-large for Style.com, where he hosted Throwback Thursdays, a fashion retrospective. In 2015, he became Editor-at-Large of fashion website The Business of Fashion.

Blanks has written for a number of international magazines and newspapers, including Another, LOVE, Interview, The New York Times, Fantastic Man and System. He is the author of The World of Anna Sui and Versace Catwalk and has also contributed to monographs on, among others, Alexander McQueen, Dolce & Gabbana, Walter Van Beirendonck, Bottega Veneta and Dries Van Noten. In 2013, he was honored by the Council of Fashion Designers of America with its Media Award, the industry’s top award for fashion journalism.

In 2017, Blanks became Mentor of the Master in Fashion Critique and Curation at Polimoda fashion school in Florence, Italy.

Personal life 
Blanks was born in Auckland, New Zealand. He left the country in 1974. Blanks has lived with his partner Jeff Lounds, a perfume specialist, in London, England since 1990.

References

Canadian editors
Canadian television hosts
Living people
Year of birth missing (living people)
Canadian fashion journalists